Charles Avila Séguin (August 7, 1883 – December 9, 1965) was an Ontario lawyer and political figure. He represented Russell in the Legislative Assembly of Ontario as a Conservative member from 1929 to 1934.

Background
Charles Avila Séguin was born in Montreal, Quebec, on August 7, 1883, and studied at the University of Ottawa and Osgoode Hall Law School. In 1912, he married Germaine, the daughter of Wilfrid Bruno Nantel, who was a federal cabinet minister.

Politics
He ran unsuccessfully against Aurélien Bélanger in 1926 before being elected in 1929, defeating Bélanger. In 1928, he was named King's Counsel. In 1940, Séguin ran unsuccessfully for a seat in the House of Commons in Ottawa East.

He died in Ottawa, December 9, 1965.

References

 Histoire des Comtes Unis de Prescott et de Russell, L. Brault (1963)
 Canadian Parliamentary Guide, 1931, AL Normandin

External links 

1883 births
1965 deaths
Canadian King's Counsel
Franco-Ontarian people
Progressive Conservative Party of Ontario MPPs